Hydrocotyle hexagona is a species of flowering plant in the family Araliaceae. It is endemic to Ecuador. Its natural habitat is subtropical or tropical moist montane forests.
It is threatened by habitat loss.

References

hexagona
Endemic flora of Ecuador
Vulnerable plants
Vulnerable biota of South America
Taxa named by Mildred Esther Mathias
Taxonomy articles created by Polbot